This is a list of notable people from Bedford, in Bedfordshire, England. People on this list may have been born in Bedford, attended school there, or resided in Bedford. For people whose primary association to Bedford is an education from the Bedford School, see the list of people educated at Bedford School. For people whose primary association to Bedford is an education from Bedford Modern School, see the List of Old Bedford Modernians.

Academics 
 C. E. M. Hansel (1917–2011) Emeritus Professor of Experimental Psychology
 Hubert Horace Lamb (1913–1997) English climatologist
 Dame Bertha Phillpotts, Scandinavian scholar and pioneer of university education for women
Stephen Shalet, endocrinologist

Athletes 

 Harold Abrahams, 1924 Olympic 100 metres champion and character in the film Chariots of Fire
 Sam Baldock, Reading footballer
 Martin Bayfield, rugby player
 Peter Bichener, cricketer
 Joe Bugner, heavyweight boxer
 Calum Davenport, Ex-West Ham United footballer
 Kelvin Davis, Southampton F.C. footballer
 Eddie "The Eagle" Edwards, ski jumper
 Gail Emms badminton doubles 2004 Olympic silver medallist
 Tim Foster, men's Olympic gold medallist in rowing
 Lil Fuccillo, former footballer and manager, technical director for Luton Town F.C.
 Barry Fry, former manager of Peterborough United F.C.
 Phelan Hill, men's eight rowing Olympic bronze medalist
 Andy Johnson, England and Queens Park Rangers F.C. footballer
 Lance Painter, MLB player with the Colorado Rockies, St. Louis Cardinals, Toronto Blue Jays, and the Milwaukee Brewers
 Arthur Poole, cricketer
 Paula Radcliffe, the United Kingdom's top female long-distance runner and world record holder for the women's marathon since 2002
 Basil Rogers (1896–1975), cricketer
 Etienne Stott, canoe slalom 2012 Olympic gold medalist
 Matt Skelton, heavyweight boxer
 Greg Taylor, professional footballer playing for Cambridge United
 Nick Tandy, racing driver, winner of the 2015 24 Hours of Le Mans
 Tim Thomas, kickboxer
 Ian Thompson, runner

Businesspeople 
 Steve Mattin, automobile designer
 Charles Wells, founder of Charles Wells Brewery Ltd

Entertainers 

 Matt Berry, comedian and actor
 Ronnie Barker, the late comedian
 Howard Bentham, broadcaster
 Jacqueline Boatswain, actress
 Don Broco, an alternative rock band formed in Bedford in 2008
 Tom Grennan, singer
 John Le Mesurier, actor and comedian
 Rachel Nicholls, soprano in opera and concert
 John Oliver, comedian, host of HBO's Last Week Tonight
 Carolyn Sampson, soprano
 Carol Vorderman, television personality, co-host of Channel 4 game show Countdown
 Esme Young, fashion designer and judge of the BBC reality show The Great British Sewing Bee

Politicians 
 William Robert Bousfield, lawyer, politician and scientist
 Frank Branston, first directly elected mayor of Bedford and former owner of the Bedfordshire on Sunday newspaper
 William Fitzhugh, also known as William the Immigrant, American politician
 Richard Fuller, Member of Parliament for Bedford and Kempston 2010-2017
 Patrick Hall, Member of Parliament for Bedford and Kempston from 1997 to 2010
 Sir William Harpur, Lord Mayor of London in 1561
 Dave Hodgson, current directly elected mayor of Bedford
 Alfred Mitchell-Innes, diplomat, who also served on Bedford Town Council for 23 years
Mohammad Yasin, current Member of Parliament for Bedford and Kempston.

Writers 

John Akass, Fleet Street journalist
Charlotte Eliza Bousfield, diarist
 John Bunyan, Puritan preacher and author of The Pilgrim's Progress 
Norah Burke, novelist and non-fiction writer
 Edward Grierson, barrister and crime writer
 Trevor Huddleston, Anglican bishop and anti-apartheid activist
 Toby Litt, writer, went to Bedford Modern School and lived in nearby Ampthill
 Jonathan Stroud, fantasy novelist 
 Laura Wade, playwright
 William Hale White, a minor Victorian novelist who wrote under the pseudonym Mark Rutherford

Other notables 
 Apsley Cherry-Garrard, Antarctic explorer
 John Howard, prison reformer and philanthropist
 Charles Edward Mallows, architect of the Arts and Crafts movement
 Phoebe Prince (1994–2010), teenager who became a cause célèbre after bullying drove her to suicide
 Mackay Hugh Baillie Scott, architect of the Arts and Crafts movement
 Captain Tom (1920-2021) World War 2 veteran and fund-raiser.

See also 
 List of people educated at Bedford School
 List of Old Bedford Modernians

References 

Bedford